Small Town Boy is a 1937 American film directed by Glenn Tryon.

Plot

Cast 
Stuart Erwin as Henry Armstrong
Joyce Compton as Molly Summers
Jed Prouty as Otis Armstrong
Clara Blandick as Mrs. Armstrong
Dorothy Appleby as Sandra French
James Blakeley as Eddie Armstrong
Clarence Wilson as Curtis French
John T. Murray as C. Lafferty
Lew Kelly as The Judge
Victor Potel as Abner Towner
Erville Alderson as Mr. Trindle
William Ruhl as A Waiter
George Chandler as Bill Clipper
Henry Roquemore as Ted Fritter

External links 

1937 films
1937 romantic comedy films
American black-and-white films
American romantic comedy films
Grand National Films films
1930s English-language films
1930s American films